The following lists give an overview of the subdivision of the city of Eindhoven into districts, quarters and neighborhoods, as determined by the municipality of Eindhoven.

Eindhoven consists of 7 districts, which are subdivided into a total of 19 quarters. The quarters are divided into a total of 109 neighborhoods.

Districts

Quarters and neighborhoods by district

District Centrum

District Stratum

District Tongelre

District Woensel-Zuid

District Woensel-Noord

District Strijp

District Gestel

Eindhoven